Lunglei district is one of the eleven districts of Mizoram state in India. As of 2011 it is the second most populous district in the state, after Aizawl.

Toponymy
The district is named after its headquarters, Lunglei. Lunglei, sometimes spelled Lungleh, in Mizo means a bridge of rock. It derived its name from a bridge like rock found in the riverine area around the Nghasih, a small tributary of the river Tlawng.

Geography
The district is bounded on the north by Mamit and Aizawl districts, on the west by Bangladesh, on the south by Lawngtlai district, on the southeast by Saiha district, on the east by Myanmar and on the northeast by Serchhip District. The district occupies an area of 4538 km2. Lunglei town is the administrative headquarters of the district.

The district has 2 subdivisions, Lunglei and Tlabung. The district has seven assembly constituencies: South Tuipui, Lunglei North, Lunglei East, Lunglei West, Lunglei South, Thorang and West Tuipui.

History 
In August 1897, the missionary David Evan Jones visited the Lushai Hills. He came to Lunglei for Christmas of that year, spending the season in the hamlet of Pukpui. Sufficient Christian influence remained in the area that during World War II, inhabitants of the village held prayer services in churches.

Demographics
According to the 2011 census Lunglei district has a population of 161,428, roughly equal to the nation of Saint Lucia. This gives it a ranking of 597th in India (out of a total of 640). Its population growth rate over the decade 2001-2011 was 17.64%. Lunglei has a sex ratio of 947 females for every 1000 males, and a literacy rate of 88.86%.

References

External links
 Official site
 
 

 
Districts of Mizoram